The siege of Barentu took place in 1977 in and around the town of Barentu in western Eritrea. It was jointly laid to siege by the Eritrean Liberation Front (ELF) and the Eritrean People's Liberation Front (EPLF) against the forces of Ethiopia. This was a decisive battle during the Eritrean War of Independence and marked the beginning of Soviet involvement in the conflict.

The battle 
The town of Barentu was defended by a large garrison of Ethiopian troops. The garrison had constructed numerous fortifications to improve the defensibility of the town. Furthermore, a local Kunama militia had been raised to support the Ethiopian troops. Of most significance in this battle however, was the decision by Soviet military advisers to commit to direct involvement.

During the siege of Barentu, the Soviet planners used their air superiority to their advantage by using close air support. This close air support inflicted heavy casualties on the forces of the ELF and EPLF who were conducting their first major joint operation. The failure of this joint operation would have significant consequences later in the war of independence.

According to reports, fighting between the ELF and EPLF also happened, and caused around 400 casualties.

The failure of the siege and the heavy losses incurred by both the ELF and EPLF forces in this battle, as well as the failure at the Battle of Massawa, led to the strategic withdrawal of rebel forces.

References

1978 in Eritrea
1978 in Ethiopia
Eritrean War of Independence
Battles of the Ethiopian Civil War
Conflicts in 1978
Ethiopia–Soviet Union relations